Slavníč is a municipality and village in Havlíčkův Brod District in the Vysočina Region of the Czech Republic. It has about 60 inhabitants.

Transport
The D1 motorway runs thorugh the municipality.

References

Villages in Havlíčkův Brod District